Bisnaga  may refer to:

 Bisnaga (cactus), a genus of large, barrel-shaped cacti
 Bisnaga (herb), a species of flowering plant
 Kingdom of Bisnaga, a South Indian empire